is a Japanese footballer currently playing as a forward for Balestier Khalsa.

Career statistics

Club
.

Notes

International Statistics

U17 International caps

U17 International goals

U16 International caps

U16 International goals

References

External links

2002 births
Living people
Japanese footballers
Japanese expatriate footballers
Association football forwards
J3 League players
Cerezo Osaka players
Cerezo Osaka U-23 players
Albirex Niigata Singapore FC players
Balestier Khalsa FC players
Japanese expatriate sportspeople in Singapore
Expatriate footballers in Singapore